Peter Joseph Dooling (February 15, 1857 – October 18, 1931) was an American businessman and politician who served four terms as a U.S. Representative from New York from 1913 to 1921.

Biography
Born in New York City, Dooling attended the public schools.
He engaged in the real-estate business.

He served as court officer in the court of general sessions in 1887–1889.
He served as member of the board of aldermen of New York City in 1891 and 1892.
Deputy clerk of the court of special sessions in 1893–1895.
He served as member of the aqueduct commission in 1898.
Deputy commissioner of the department of water supply, gas, and electricity in 1898–1901.

State legislature 
He was a member of the New York State Senate (16th D.) from 1903 to 1905, sitting in the 126th, 127th and 128th New York State Legislatures. He was Clerk of New York County from 1906 to 1908.

Congress 
Dooling was elected as a Democrat to the Sixty-third and to the three succeeding Congresses (March 4, 1913 – March 3, 1921).
He served as chairman of the Committee on Expenditures in the Department of War (Sixty-fifth Congress).
He was an unsuccessful candidate for reelection in 1920 to the Sixty-seventh Congress.
Sheriff of New York County, New York in 1924.

Later career and death 
He served as commissioner of the department of purchases of New York City in 1926.
Reengaged in the real-estate business.

He died in New York City October 18, 1931.
He was interred in Calvary Cemetery.

References

1857 births
1931 deaths
Burials at Calvary Cemetery (Queens)
Democratic Party members of the United States House of Representatives from New York (state)
Sheriffs of New York County, New York